Patronville is an unincorporated community in Ohio Township, Spencer County, in the U.S. state of Indiana.

History
A post office was established at Patronville in 1875, and remained in operation until it was discontinued in 1904. Edward P. Harrison was an early postmaster.

Geography

References

Unincorporated communities in Spencer County, Indiana
Unincorporated communities in Indiana